Megabucks is a combination of the prefix "mega-" (meaning "million" or another large amount) and "bucks" (meaning dollars), used to denote a large amount of money.

Megabucks may also refer to:

Lottery games 
 Megabucks, operated by the Oregon Lottery
 Megabucks, operated by the Wisconsin Lottery
 Megabucks Doubler, operated by the Massachusetts Lottery
 Tri-State Megabucks Plus, operated by the Tri-State Lottery in Maine, New Hampshire, and Vermont

Other 
 The Mega Bucks, professional wrestling team of Ted DiBiase and André the Giant in the unsanctioned Million Dollar Championship
 Megabucks (slot machine), a brand of linked progressive jackpot slot machines
 A fictional currency in the Illuminati card game